Events in the year 1807 in art.

Events
Napoleon Bonaparte purchases the Borghese art collection, including a 2nd century bust, the Antinous Mondragone, and brings it to Paris, where in 1808 it is placed at the Louvre.
William Thomas Beckford moves into Fonthill Abbey, built to house the art collection, even though construction has not finished.

Works

William Blake – illustrations of Paradise Lost
Jacques-Louis David – The Coronation of Napoleon
Arthur William Devis – The Death of Nelson, 21 October 1805
Caspar David Friedrich
Cairn in Snow
Cross in the Mountains (Tetschen Altar)
Daniel Turner – Nelson's Funeral Procession on the Thames, 9 January 1806
J. M. W. Turner – Sun Rising Through Vapour, Fishermen Cleaning and Selling Fish
Horace Vernet - Napoleon at the Battle of Friedland
Hendrik Voogd – Italian Landscape with Umbrella Pines
David Wilkie – Rent Day

Births
February 4 – Max Emanuel Ainmiller, German glass painter (died 1870)
September 10 – Friedrich Gauermann, Austrian painter (died 1862)
September 22 – Ulisse Cambi, Italian sculptor (died 1895)
October 5 – Constant Dutilleux, French illustrator and engraver (died 1865)
date unknown – Jean Achard, French painter (died 1884)

Deaths
 February 9 – Joseph-Benoît Suvée, Flemish painter (born 1743)
 March 8 – Sawrey Gilpin, English painter of animals (born 1733)
 April 2 – Balthasar Anton Dunker, German landscape painter and etcher (born 1746)
 April 6 – John Opie, English historical and portrait painter (born 1761)
 April 28 – Jacob Philipp Hackert, German-born landscape painter (born 1737)
 July 28 – Jan Regulski, Polish glyptic artist and medalist (born 1760)
 September 18 – Franciszek Smuglewicz, Polish draughtsman and painter (born 1745)
 November 5 – Angelica Kauffman, Swiss-Austrian painter (born 1741)
 December 6 – Niclas Lafrensen, Swedish genre and miniature painter (born 1737)
 date unknown
 Eliphalet Chapin, American furniture designer (born 1741)
 Nathaniel Grogan, Irish painter from Cork (born 1740)

References

 
Years of the 19th century in art
1800s in art